Kako to misliš: mi (What Do You Mean By 'Us' ) is the eighth studio album by the Serbian indie/alternative rock band Obojeni Program released by the Serbian netlabel Exit Muisic for free digital download as well as the independent record label Odličan Hrčak in 2012.

Track listing 
All music and lyrics by Obojeni Program.

Personnel 
The band
 Branislav Babić "Kebra" — vocals
 Ilija Vlaisavljević "Bebec" — bass guitar, production
 Ljubomir Pejić "Ljuba" — bass guitar, backing vocals
 Vladimir Cinkocki "Cina" — drums, backing vocals

Additional personnel
 Biljana Babić — vocals, backing vocals
 Jelena Katjez — vocals, backing vocals

References 

 Kako to misliš: mi at Discogs
 EX YU ROCK enciklopedija 1960-2006, Janjatović Petar; 
 NS rockopedija, novosadska rock scena 1963-2003, Mijatović Bogomir, SWITCH, 2005

Obojeni Program albums
2012 albums